Gervase  Frank Ashworth Jackson-Stops  (26 April 1947 – 2 July 1995, in London) was an architectural historian and journalist.

Education
He was educated at Harrow and later won an exhibition to Christ Church, Oxford and here he was amused that his tutor put down on his list as required reading Burke's Peerage. His grandfather, Herbert Jackson-Stops, founded the eponymous and up-market estate agency.

He trained with a Museums Association Studentship at the Victoria and Albert Museum from 1969–71 and as a research assistant at the National Trust between 1972 & 75.

National Trust
He was the Architectural Adviser to the National Trust for over 20 years, earning enormous respect as result of which he broke fresh ground when he fought for the rescue of the decaying Northamptonshire manor-house at Canons Ashby. It was the first time that Government funds, rather than the traditional family endowment, were used to save an historic house.

He was also the curator of various exhibitions including "The Treasure Houses of Britain", held at the National Gallery of Art, Washington, DC in 1985–86. He also contributed numerous scholarly architectural articles to Country Life magazine between 1973 and 1995. He was appointed OBE in 1987.

The Menagerie

Jackson-Stops developed a unique home in The Menagerie, a Grade II listed building at Horton, Northamptonshire, part of the estate buildings for the now demolished Horton House and seat of the Earl of Halifax. The building is a one-storey building with corner pavilions and a raised central area. The surrounding windows are by Gibbs. The work has most recently been attributed to Thomas Wright who undertook work for Lord Halifax in the 1730s.  
The saving of this unusual building was Jackson-Stops's own private achievement; when he first heard of the property in 1972, he found an architectural dream; here he restored one of the finest English Rococo plasterwork rooms, complete with Father Time, the Four Winds, and above the cornice 12 large-scale medallions of the Zodiac. Later on in the  gardens he added two further follies and, with his partner Ian Kirby, created a romantic English garden which incorporated both a formal period-design an exciting modern planting.

For Jackson-Stops, the Menagerie was his own country house in miniature and in the manner of a country house and in the tradition of the fête champêtre, he hosted a succession of parties, often accompanied by the staging of operatic works.  A week or so before his death he gave what would be his final party to celebrate the opening of his "shell grotto" with its suggestions of the underworld. He died of an AIDS-related illness.

The National Trust undertook the restoration of The Chinese House at Stowe in his memory.

References

External links
COPAC listing of his published works

1995 deaths
1947 births
Officers of the Order of the British Empire
Alumni of Christ Church, Oxford
British architecture writers
AIDS-related deaths in England
People educated at Harrow School